Amâncio João Pita Canhembe (born 16 November 1997) is a Mozambican footballer who plays as a midfielder for Marítimo B.

Career
Canhembe started his career with Mozambican side Liga Desportiva, where he was nicknamed "Neymar" after the Brazilian international.

Before the second half of 2015–16, Canhembe joined the youth academy of Sporting in the Portuguese top flight. In 2016, he signed for Portuguese third division club Sertanense.

References

External links
 
 Amâncio Canhembe at playmakerstats.com

1997 births
Living people
Sportspeople from Maputo
Mozambican footballers
Association football midfielders
Mozambique international footballers
Sertanense F.C. players